S. Kesava Adithan (born 8 November 1933) was an Indian politician and former Member of the Legislative Assembly. He was elected to the Tamil Nadu legislative assembly as an Anna Dravida Munnetra Kazhagam candidate from Tiruchendur constituency in 1980 election.

Political career
He was elected to the Tamil Nadu legislative assembly as an Anna Dravida Munnetra Kazhagam candidate from Tiruchendur constituency in 1980 election.

Personal life
Kesava Adithan was born to Mrs. Chinna Thangam and Mr. T. S. Sivanthi Adithan (Postmaster), on 8 November 1933 at Kayamozhi, Tamil Nadu, India. He is the eldest and had two younger brothers.

Having completed his schooling in Nazareth he did a PUC in St Johns College, Tirunelveli, and started his political career at the age of 16 in DMK then later joined with ADMK along with M. G. Ramachandran (MGR).

He was married to Senthamarai Devi of Mavadipannai in January 1956 at the age of 23.

He had four daughters namely Saratha, Premalatha, Brindha, Susaritha and two sons namely Chokkalinga Kumarasa Adithan and Thanikesa Adithan.

He died in a car accident on 26 November 1982.

References 

All India Anna Dravida Munnetra Kazhagam politicians
1933 births
1982 deaths
Tamil Nadu politicians